Sarah Smart (born 3 March 1977) is an English actress.

Early life 
Smart was born on 3 March 1977 in Birmingham, England and lived in Northfield until 1987. She was a pupil of St Paul's School for Girls in Birmingham.

Career 
Her career started as a child in the television series Woof! She is known for a series of television roles including Virginia Braithwaite, daughter of a lottery winning family in the comedy drama At Home with the Braithwaites. Sparkhouse (Red Production Company/BBC 2002) and her appearance in Jane Hall (Red Production Company/ITV1 2006) marked a link between Smart and television writer Sally Wainwright. Between 2008 and 2012, she played Ann-Britt Höglund in Wallander, nine feature-length adaptations of Henning Mankell's Wallander novels, for the BBC. Smart has also been featured in a number of radio dramas.  In 2011, she appeared in a two-part story for the sixth series of the BBC series Doctor Who as the sympathetic 'villain' of The Rebel Flesh/The Almost People.

Selected filmography
Silent Witness — Remembrance (2017)
The Musketeers (2016, TV Series)
New Tricks - Body of Evidence (2012, TV series)
The Secret of Crickley Hall (2012)
Death In Paradise (2011, TV series)
Fast Freddie, The Widow and Me (2011, Christmas Special)
The Man Who Crossed Hitler (2011, TV Movie)
Doctor Who – "The Rebel Flesh" and "The Almost People" (2011, TV series)
Midsomer Murders – Echoes of the Dead (2011)
Monroe (2011, TV Drama)
Agatha Christie's Marple (2010, TV series)
Casualty 1909 (2009, TV series)
Agatha Christie's Poirot – "Mrs McGinty's Dead" (2008)
Wallander (2008, TV series)
Casualty 1907 (2008, TV series)
Ghosts (2007, Theatre)
Five Days (2007, TV series)
Jane Hall (2006, TV series)
Casualty 1906 (2006, TV series)
Funland (2005, TV series)
Sparkhouse (2002, TV series)
Dalziel and Pascoe Walls Of Silence (2001)
David Copperfield (2000, television movie)
At Home with the Braithwaites (2000, TV series)
Wuthering Heights (1998, TV series)
Soldier Soldier (1997, TV series)
A Touch of Frost – "Penny for the Guy" (1997)

References

External links

1977 births
Living people
English television actresses
English radio actresses
English stage actresses
Actresses from Birmingham, West Midlands
English child actresses